Mount Huxley is a name shared by a number of places:

Mount Huxley (Alaska), a mountain peak in the Saint Elias Mountains
Mount Huxley (Antarctica), a mountain in Antarctica
Mount Huxley (California), a mountain in California
Mount Huxley (Tasmania), a mountain in Australia
Mount Huxley (Western Australia), another mountain in Australia